Chionodes lector is a moth in the family Gelechiidae. It is found in North America, where it has been recorded from California and Washington.

The larvae feed on Acer macrophyllum.

References

Chionodes
Moths described in 1999
Moths of North America